Don Lolo (born 21 July 1994) is a Tongan rugby union player who plays for  for the 2022 Super Rugby Pacific season. His playing position is lock. He is a Tongan international, making his debut in 2021 against New Zealand.

References

External links
itsrugby.co.uk profile

1994 births
Tongan rugby union players
Tonga international rugby union players
Living people
Rugby union locks
Moana Pasifika players